The World Group Play-offs were four ties which involved the losing nations of the World Group first round and the winning nations of the World Group II. Nations that won their play-off ties entered the 2016 World Group, while losing nations joined the 2016 World Group II.

Italy vs. USA

Netherlands vs. Australia

Poland vs. Switzerland

Canada vs. Romania

References 

World Group Play-offs